Pseudechis is a genus of venomous snakes in the family Elapidae. It contains the group of elapid species commonly referred to as the black snakes. Species of Pseudechis are found in every Australian state with the exception of Tasmania, and some species are found in Papua New Guinea. They inhabit a variety of habitat types, from arid areas to swampland. All species are dangerous (Pseudechis signifying "like a viper", Greek echis) and can inflict a potentially lethal bite. Most snakes in this genus reach about 2 m (6.6 ft) in total length (including tail), and vary in colour. Some species are brown, whereas others are black. The most recognisable and widespread species in the genus are the red-bellied black snake (P. porphyriacus) and the mulga snake (king brown) (P. australis). These snakes feed on lizards, frogs, birds, small mammals, and even other snakes. All species of Pseudechis lay eggs with the exception of the red-bellied black snake P. porphyriacus which is viviparous. The genus Pailsus is a synonym of Pseudechis, and more work is needed to understand species limits among the smaller species of the group.

Taxonomy
The genus was established in 1860 by Johann Wagler, separating a species previously described by George Shaw in the new combination Pseudechis porphyriacus as a monotypic genus. The systematic revision of the elapid family by George Albert Boulenger in 1896 allied the descriptions of eight species, and by 1933 the number totalled taxa assigned to the genus. A revision of Pseudechis by Roy D. Mackay in 1955 placed many of these descriptions in synonymy, reducing the number of recognised species to five. The examination of a large series of specimens of the king brown Pseudechis australis was undertaken by Laurie Smith, recognising clinal variability within the population and separating a form with significant distinctions in morphology as a sixth species of the genus, Pseudechis butleri.

The taxonomy of snakes of the genus Pseudechis is unsettled, with at least one species undescribed; several recent phylogenetic studies have provided evidence of the presence of species beyond the six recognised in most books.

Nota bene: A binomial authority in parentheses indicates that the species was originally described in a genus other than Pseudechis.

References

Further reading
Boulenger GA (1896). Catalogue of the Snakes in the British Museum (Natural History). Volume III., Containing the Colubridæ (Opisthoglyphæ and Proteroglyphæ) ... London: Trustees of the British Museum (Natural History). (Taylor and Francis, printers). xiv + 727 pp. + Plates I-XXV. (Genus Pseudechis, pp. 327–328).
Wagler J (1830). Natürliches System der AMPHIBIEN, mit vorangehender Classification der SÄUGTHIERE und VÖGEL. Ein Beitrag zur vergleichenden Zoologie. Munich, Stuttgart and Tübingen: J.G. Cotta. vi + 354 pp. + one plate. (Pseudechis, new genus, p. 171). (in German and Latin).

 
Snake genera
Taxa named by Johann Georg Wagler